AGC may refer to:

Organizations

In business
 AGC Inc. (formerly Asahi Glass Co.), a glass manufacturer
 Associated General Contractors of America, an association of commercial construction contractors
 Australian Guarantee Corporation, a financial company

Military
 Army Geospatial Center, part of the US Army Corps of Engineers
 Adjutant General's Corps, in the British Army
 Amphibious Force, Flagship a World War 2 ship.

Religious organizations
 Apostolic Generation Church, a non-denominational church located in Jakarta, Indonesia
 Associated Gospel Churches of Canada, a Canadian evangelical Christian denomination

Other organizations
 Assyrian General Conference, a political organization in Iraq
  Autodefensas Gaitanistas de Colombia (aka The Gulf Clan), a drug cartel and paramilitary group in Colombia

Science and technology
 Apollo Guidance Computer, for the Apollo program
 Atypical Glandular Cells, in the Bethesda system for reporting Pap smear results
 Automatic gain control of electronic amplification
 Automatic generation control of electricity generators
 Autorail à grande capacité, a type of train
 Auxiliary General sub-class C, formerly U.S. Navy ship type Amphibious Command Ship
 Automated Guided Cart, a small Automated Guided Vehicle
 AGC, a codon for the amino acid serine

Other uses
 Agatu language
 Allegheny County Airport, US, by IATA airport code
 Attorney General of California
 Attorney General of Canada
 Attorney General of Colombia
 Attorney General of Colorado
 Attorney General of Connecticut
 Auditor General of Canada
 Auditor General of China
 Auditor General of Colombia